Andrea Vassallo (born 30 September 1997) is an Italian footballer. He is under contract with Bologna, but is not registered to play for the club for the 2019–20 season.

Club career

Bologna

Loan to Brescia 
On 15 July 2016, Vassallo was signed by Serie B side Brescia on a season-long loan deal. On 7 August he made his debut for Brescia, as a substitute replacing Leonardo Morosini in the 71st minute of a 2–0 home defeat against Pisa in the second round of Coppa Italia. On 15 October, Vassallo made his Serie B debut, as a substitute replacing Andrea Caracciolo in the 74th minute of a 1–1 home draw against Salernitana. On 25 October he scored his first professional goal, as a substitute, in the 87th minute of a 2–1 home win over Vicenza. Vassallo ended his loan to Brescia with only 4 apparences, all as a substitute, and 1 goal. During this season he played also 6 matches with Brescia youth team.

Loan to Carrarese 
On 20 July 2017, Vassallo was signed by Serie C side Carrarese on a season-long loan deal. On 27 August he made his Serie C debut for Carrarese as a substitute replacing Tommaso Biasci in the 85th minute of a 1–0 away win over Cuneo. On 4 October, Vassallo scored his first goal for Carrarese in the 29th minute of a 5–2 away win over Prato. On 15 October he scored his second goal in the 46th minute of a 2–2 away draw against Giana Erminio. On 9 November he played his first entire match for Carrarese, a 3–2 home defeat against Pisa. On 26 November, Vassallo scored his third goal in the 52nd minute of a 4–1 home win over Pontedera. Vassallo ended his season-long loan to Carrarese with 33 appearances, 6 goals and 3 assists.

Loan to Catania and Renate 
On 14 July 2018, Vassallo was loaned to another Serie C club Catania on a season-long loan deal. On 29 September he made his Serie C debut for Catania as a substitute replacing Kalifa Manneh in the 66th minute of a 2–1 away win over Rende. On 16 October he was sent off, as a substitute, with a double yellow card in the 91st minute of a 3–1 home win over Trapani. One month later, on 17 November, he played his first entire match for the team, a 0–0 away draw against Juve Stabia. Ten days later he scored his first goal for Catania in the 39th minute of a 2–0 away win over Matera. However, in January 2019, his loan was interrupted and he left Catania with 13 appearances, only 5 as a starter and 1 goal.

On 30 January 2019, Vassallo was signed by Renate on a 6-month loan deal. On 16 February he made his debut for the club as a substitute replacing Davide Guglielmotti in the 81st minute of a 1–1 home draw against Pordenone. Two weeks later, on 3 March, Vassallo played his first match as a starter, a 1–0 home defeat against Ravenna, he was replaced by Alberto Spagnoli after 46 minutes. Vassallo ended his 6-month loan to Renate with only 4 appearances, but only 1 as a starter.

International career 
Vassallo represented Italy at Under-18 and Under-19 level. On 22 October 2014 he made his U-18 debut as a substitute replacing Simone Minelli in the 82nd minute of a 1–0 home defeat against Austria U-18. On 18 November 2014, Vassallo played his first entire match at U-18 and he scored his first international goal in the 86th minute of a 3–1 home win over Croatia U-18. On 12 May 2015 he scored his second goal at U-18 level in the 52nd minute of a 2–0 home win over Iran U-18. On 16 December 2015, Vassallo made his debut at U-19 level in a 4–1 home win over Serbia U-19, but he was replaced by Edoardo Soleri in the 8th minute for an injury.

Career statistics

Club

References

1997 births
Footballers from Milan
Italian footballers
Association football forwards
Living people
A.C. Milan players
Bologna F.C. 1909 players
Brescia Calcio players
Carrarese Calcio players
Catania S.S.D. players
A.C. Renate players
Serie B players
Serie C players